Agge may refer to:

 Agge, a village in Ekeremor, Bayelsa State, Nigeria
 Agge, a village near Shashamane, Ethiopia
 Agge, the father of Sven Aggesen, a Danish historian

Agge may also refer to Sawdhan Agge, an album by Indian comedian Bhagwant Mann.

AgGe may refer to silver and germanium. These elements may form:

 A common alloy used for many purposes including sterling silver
 A crystal structure
 A metal-semiconductor interface; see metal-induced gap states

AgGE may refer to Agarose gel electrophoresis, a technique in microbiology.

AGGE may refer to:

 Ad hoc Group of Governmental Experts, a title given to many committees of the United Nations
 Agalinis georgiana, the beach false foxglove plant (USDA code: AGGE), also known as Agalinis fasciculata
 Balalae Airport, in the Solomon Islands (ICAO code: AGGE)

See also

 Aga (disambiguation)
 Agadoo doo doo, a nonsense lyric from 1984 novelty song Agadoo
 Agar, a gelatinous substance used in confectionery and microbiology 
 Age (disambiguation)
 Agey, a commune in Côte-d'Or, Bourgogne, France 
 AGG (disambiguation)
 AAGE, the Australian Association of Graduate Employers
 Agga (disambiguation)
 Aggar (disambiguation)
 Saint Aggei, Wycliffe's spelling of Mar Aggai, the second Bishop of Edessa, Mesopotamia
 Agger, a Roman embankment
 Aggey (disambiguation)
 Aggi (disambiguation)
 Aggie (disambiguation)
 Aggy (disambiguation)
 Agha (disambiguation)
 Agy, a commune in the Basse-Normandie région of France
 Egge (disambiguation)